2807 Karl Marx, provisional designation , is a carbonaceous Dorian asteroid from the central region of the asteroid belt, approximately 17 kilometers in diameter. It was discovered on 15 October 1969, by Russian astronomer Lyudmila Chernykh at the Crimean Astrophysical Observatory in Nauchnyj on the Crimean peninsula. The asteroid was later named for revolutionary socialist Karl Marx.

Orbit and classification

Dora family 

Karl Marx is a member of the Dora family, a well-determined asteroid family of more than 1,200 known members with a carbonaceous composition. The family's namesake is 668 Dora. It is alternatively known as the "Zhongolovich family", named after its presumably largest member 1734 Zhongolovich. The Dora family may also contain a subfamily.

Orbit and observation arc 

It orbits the Sun in the central main-belt at a distance of 2.3–3.3 AU once every 4 years and 8 months (1,707 days). Its orbit has an eccentricity of 0.18 and an inclination of 8° with respect to the ecliptic.

Its first used observation is a precovery taken at Palomar Observatory in 1954, extending the body's observation arc by 15 years prior to its official discovery observation at Nauchnyj.

Physical characteristics 

In the SMASS classification, Karl Marx is classified as a carbonaceous C-type asteroid. According to the survey carried out by NASA's Wide-field Infrared Survey Explorer with its subsequent NEOWISE mission, Karl Marx measures 16.9 kilometers in diameter and its surface has an albedo of 0.057.

Lightcurves 

As of 2017, no rotational lightcurve of Karl Marx has been obtained. The body's rotation period and shape remains unknown.

Naming 

This minor planet was named after German philosopher, economist and revolutionary socialist Karl Marx (1818–1883), student of the theories about society, economics and politics, and author of Das Kapital, the foundational theoretical text of modern communist thought. The official naming citation was published by the Minor Planet Center on 24 July 1983.

References

External links 
 Asteroid Lightcurve Database (LCDB), query form (info )
 Dictionary of Minor Planet Names, Google books
 Asteroids and comets rotation curves, CdR – Observatoire de Genève, Raoul Behrend
 Discovery Circumstances: Numbered Minor Planets (1)-(5000) – Minor Planet Center
 
 

002807
Discoveries by Lyudmila Chernykh
Named minor planets
2807 Karl Marx
002807
19691015